Nueva Caceres, officially the City of Nueva Caceres, was a colonial Spanish city in the Philippines. Established by Captain Pedro de Sanchez in 1575, the city was named in honor of Governor-General Francisco de Sande who was a native of Cáceres, Spain. In 1595, a papal bull coming from the Vatican City created the See of Cáceres under the Archdiocese of Manila.

Nueva Caceres was considered the center of economy and industry in the Bicol Region, and the city was made capital of the province of Camarines. When the province was dissolved in 1829 and 1857, the city then became the capital of Camarines Sur. From 1902 until 1908, some villages of Canaman and Camaligan were annexed to the city.

In 1919, under the Insular Government, most of Nueva Caceres became part of the municipality of Naga, while several villages in the northwest were retroceded to their respective mother towns.

References

External links 
 Catolic Encyclopedia: Nueva Caceres
 September Peñafrancia Festivities in the Ciudad de Nueva Caceres
 History of the Philippine Islands, recalling the establishment of the city.
 History of Camarines Sur: Department of Tourism, Philippines
 National Historical Institute Side of Juan Luna, Tomas Arejola, Recollection of confrontation of Hermano Pule and Bishop of Nueva Caceres
 Further readings: (Filipiniana.net)
Nueva Caceres
Report on the fall of the Spanish forces in Nueva Caceres and Albay, 6 October 1898

Populated places established in 1575
1575 establishments in the Philippines
Populated places disestablished in 1919
1919 disestablishments in the Philippines
Former cities in the Philippines
History of Camarines Sur
Naga, Camarines Sur